AMBIT is a historical programming language that was introduced by Carlos Christensen of Massachusetts Computer Associates in 1964 for symbolic computation.<ref name="ambit">Carlos Christensen: Examples of Symbol Manipulation in the AMBIT Programming Language. in ACM '65: Proceedings of the ACM '65 conference. 1965, pp. 247-261.</ref> 
The language was influenced by ALGOL 60 and is an early example of a pattern matching language for manipulation of strings (a more popular example from the same time is SNOBOL).
The acronym AMBIT stands for "Algebraic Manipulation by Identity Translation", but has also claimed "Acronym May Be Ignored Totally".
AMBIT had dialects for manipulation of lists (AMBIT-L) and graphs (AMBIT-G)P. D. Rovner, D. A. Henderson: On the implementation of AMBIT/G: a graphical programming language, Proceedings of the 1st international joint conference on Artificial intelligence, ACM, 1969 
Both pioneered with data structure diagrams and visual programming as data and patterns were used to be represented by directed-graph diagrams.
AMBIT/L was implemented for a PDP-10 computer and used to implement the interactive algebraic manipulation system IAM.

 Literature 
 Carlos Christensen, Michael S. Wolfberg, Michael J. Fischer: A Report on AMBIT/G'' (Volume I-IV), Massachusetts Computer Associates Inc. 1971

References 

Programming languages created in 1964
Visual programming languages